Gemma Barker (born in 1990) is a British woman from Staines, Surrey, who was convicted of sexual assault and fraud for establishing physical relationships with teenagers while dressed in the persona of fictional teenage boys.

Background
Whilst living in West Molesey, Surrey, Barker became close friends with teenager Jessica Sayers and another teenage girl (who opted to remain anonymous in press). She then created three fictional teenage male identities online and used these identities to befriend Sayers and the other victim and establish physical relationships. Barker was eventually arrested in the persona of "Aaron" for committing sexual assault on Sayers, but her physical sex and identity were not confirmed until she was forced to undergo a strip search.

Imprisonment
At Guildford Crown Court on 5 March 2012, Judge Peter Moss sentenced Barker to 30 months in prison after she pleaded guilty to two counts of sexual assault, to be served concurrently with three months for fraud. She was diagnosed with autism and attention deficit hyperactivity disorder (ADHD).

Media
Barker was the subject of the Channel 4 documentary The Girl Who Became Three Boys. Barker has since been released on license.

References

Crime in Surrey
Trials in England
2012 in British law